Denys Mykhaylovych Dedechko (born 2 July 1987) is a Ukrainian professional footballer who last played as a central midfielder for JK Narva Trans.

Career
On 17 June 2015, Dedechko signed a 2.5-year contract with Kazakhstan Premier League side FC Astana.

On 25 February 2016, Dedechko joined Ukrainian Premier League side FC Oleksandriya.

On 5 July 2019, Dedechko signed for Ararat Yerevan on a two-year contract.

On 16 July 2020, Dedechko signed for Noah, leaving the club on 11 December 2021.

On 4 February 2022, Narva Trans announced the signing of Dedechko.

Career statistics

Club

Honours
Noah
Armenian Supercup: 2020

References

External links 
 

1987 births
Living people
Footballers from Kyiv
Ukrainian footballers
Ukraine youth international footballers
Ukraine under-21 international footballers
Ukraine international footballers
FC Dynamo Kyiv players
FC Luch Vladivostok players
FC Amkar Perm players
FC Naftovyk-Ukrnafta Okhtyrka players
FC Krasnodar players
Ukrainian expatriate footballers
Expatriate footballers in Russia
Expatriate footballers in Kazakhstan
Expatriate footballers in Armenia
Expatriate footballers in Estonia
FC Astana players
Ukrainian Premier League players
Meistriliiga players
Russian Premier League players
FC Kryvbas Kryvyi Rih players
FC Vorskla Poltava players
FC Oleksandriya players
Ukrainian expatriate sportspeople in Kazakhstan
Ukrainian expatriate sportspeople in Russia
Ukrainian expatriate sportspeople in Armenia
Ukrainian expatriate sportspeople in Estonia
FC SKA-Khabarovsk players
Association football midfielders
FC Mariupol players
FC Tambov players
FC Ararat Yerevan players
JK Narva Trans players
Ukrainian First League players